Chennai Super Kings (CSK) is a franchise cricket team based in Chennai, India, which plays in the Indian Premier League (IPL). They were one of the eight teams that competed in the 2015 Indian Premier League. They were captained for the eighth season in succession by Mahendra Singh Dhoni.

The Super Kings reached the final of the 2015 IPL where they lost to Mumbai Indians.

IPL auction 2015
Chennai Super Kings bought the following players in the 2015 auction:
Michael Hussey
Irfan Pathan
Rahul Sharma
Kyle Abbott
Andrew Tye
Pratyush Singh
Ankush Bains
Eklavya Dwivedi

Squad
 Players with international caps before the 2015 IPL season are listed in bold.

IPL

Standings
Chennai Super Kings finished first in the league stage of IPL 2015.

Results

League Matches

Playoffs

{{4TeamBracket-PagePlayoff
| team-width=230
| score-width=120

| RD1-text1 = 19 May — Wankhede Stadium, Mumbai
| RD1-seed1 = 1
| RD1-team1 = Chennai Super Kings
| RD1-score1 = 162 (19 ov)
| RD1-seed2 = 2
| RD1-team2 = Mumbai Indians(H)
| RD1-score2 = 187/6 (20 ov)
| P1Winner = Mumbai
| P1Margin = 25 runs
| P1Matchno = 57

| RD1-text2 = 20 May — MCA Stadium, Pune
| RD1-seed3 = 3| RD1-team3 = Royal Challengers Bangalore
| RD1-score3 = 180/4 (20 ov)
| RD1-seed4 = 4
| RD1-team4 = Rajasthan Royals
| RD1-score4 = 109 (19 ov)
| P2Winner = Bangalore
| P2Margin = 71 runs
| P2Matchno= 58

| RD2-text1 = 22 May — JSCA International Cricket Stadium, Ranchi
| RD2-seed1 = 1
| RD2-team1 = Chennai Super Kings
| RD2-score1 = 140/7 (19.5 ov)
| RD2-seed2 = 3
| RD2-team2 = Royal Challengers Bangalore
| RD2-score2 = 139/8 (20 ov)
| P3Winner = Chennai
| P3Margin = 3 wickets
| P3Matchno= 59

| RD3-text1 = 24 May — Eden Gardens, Kolkata
| RD3-seed1 = 2
| RD3-team1 = Mumbai Indians
| RD3-score1 = 202/5 (20 ov) 
| RD3-seed2 = 1
| RD3-team2 = Chennai Super Kings
| RD3-score2 = 161/8 (20 ov)
| FinalWinner = Mumbai
| FinalMargin = 41 runs
| FinalMatchno= 60
}}

Qualifier 1

Qualifier 2

Final

Statistics

Most runs

 Source: Cricinfo

Most wickets

 Bravo won the Purple Cap award as the player who took the most wickets in the tournament
 Source:''' Cricinfo

References

Chennai Super Kings seasons
2015 Indian Premier League